Vazha Lortkipanidze (born November 29, 1949) is a Georgian politician, former State Minister of Georgia and Ambassador of Georgia to Russia, member of the Parliament of Georgia.

Early years
Lortkipanidze was born on November 29, 1949 in Tbilisi, Georgia. In 1973, he graduated from Mathematics Department of Tbilisi State University and Moscow Academy of Sciences with bachelor's and then doctoral degrees.

In 1983-1986, he was second and then first secretary of Central Committee of Georgian Komsomol during Eduard Shevardnadze's tenure as the First Secretary of Georgian SSR. In 1986-1988, he was the First Secretary of Mtatsminda Regional Committee of Communist Party of Georgia and then worked as the head of department in the CC of Communist Party of Georgia and in 1989-1990 as Deputy Chairman of Cabinet of Ministers of Georgia.

Political career
When Zviad Gamsakhurdia took over with independence of Georgia, Lortkipanidze left government work finding a job at Tbilisi Research Institute, but with Shevardnadze's return to power in January 1992, he was immediately appointed Chief of Staff of Presidential Administration of Georgia, a post he held until January 17, 1995. From 1995 through 1998, he was the Ambassador of Georgia to Russia. His additional duties were representing the Georgian side in the Russian-mediated negotiations with Abkhazia. He had good relations with high-ranking officials in the Russian government but at home he was considered pro-Russian by the opposition parties. Lortkipanidze was appointed State Minister of Georgia on July 31, 1998 shortly after Nikoloz Lekishvili resigned from the post on July 26 due to criticism on economic policies. Lortkipanidze left the post on May 11, 2000 and was replaced by Giorgi Arsenishvili. He was elected the leader of Christian-Democratic Union of Georgia in November 2002.

Considered a close ally to Shevardnadze, he was appointed the head of the campaign for pro-presidential block Alliance for New Georgia in the Georgian presidential election campaign.

He has a PhD in Economics and is currently a professor at Tbilisi State University. He married Irine Khomeriki in 1983 and they have two children: Nino (1984) and 
Ana (1993).

References 

Diplomats of Georgia (country)
Government ministers of Georgia (country)
1949 births
Living people
Ambassadors of Georgia (country) to Russia
Members of the Parliament of Georgia
Politicians from Tbilisi
Tbilisi State University alumni
20th-century politicians from Georgia (country)